Ferny Grove railway station is the terminus station of the Ferny Grove line in Queensland, Australia. It serves the Brisbane suburb of Ferny Grove.

The Brisbane Tramway Museum is a short walk south of the station.

History
The station opened in 1918 as part of the extension to Samford.

The line formerly extended to Dayboro, but was cut back to Ferny Grove in 1955, as part of a larger rationalisation by the Queensland Government of its railway lines. The line now terminates here with bus services running to Samford during peak times.

The station was upgraded in 2012 as part of the Keperra-Ferny Grove duplication project. The upgrade included relocating the platform, a new station building and car park.

Camp Mountain rail accident
The Camp Mountain rail accident occurred in 1947 west of Ferny Grove on the Dayboro stretch of the line. It is Queensland's worst railway accident. 16 people were killed when a picnic excursion train failed to negotiate a bend on the line between Camp Mountain and Samford.  A small memorial marks the site of the accident.

Services
Ferny Grove is the terminus for all stops services to and from Roma Street, Park Road, Coopers Plains and Beenleigh.

Services by platform

Transport links
Brisbane Transport operate three routes from Ferny Grove station:
367: to Upper Kedron
397: to Mitchelton via Everton Hills
398: to Mitchelton via Arana Hills

Brisbane Bus Lines operate one route from Ferny Grove station:
399 to Samford Village

References

External links

Ferny Grove station Queensland Rail
Ferny Grove station Queensland's Railways on the Internet
[ Ferny Grove station] TransLink travel information

Railway stations in Brisbane
Railway stations in Australia opened in 1918